A hydrogen-powered aircraft is an aeroplane that uses hydrogen fuel as a power source. Hydrogen can either be burned in a jet engine or another kind of internal combustion engine, or can be used to power a fuel cell to generate electricity to power an electric propulsor. It cannot be stored in a traditional wet wing, and hydrogen tanks have to be housed in the fuselage or be supported by the wing. 

Hydrogen, which can be produced from low-carbon power and can produce zero emissions, can reduce the environmental impact of aviation. Boeing acknowledges the technology potential and Airbus plans to launch a first commercial hydrogen-powered aircraft by 2035. McKinsey & Company forecast hydrogen aircraft entering the market in the late 2030s and scaling up through 2050, when they could account for a third of aviation's energy demand.

Hydrogen properties

Hydrogen has a specific energy of 119.9 MJ/kg, compared to ~ MJ/kg for usual liquid fuels,  times higher.
However, it has an energy density of 10.05 kJ/L at normal atmospheric pressure and temperature, compared to ~ kJ/L for liquid fuels,  times lower.

Aircraft design
The low energy density of hydrogen poses challenges when designing an aircraft, where weight and volume are critical. To reduce the size of the tanks liquid hydrogen may be used, requiring cryogenic fuel tanks. Cylindrical tanks minimise surface for minimal thermal insulation weight, leading towards tanks in the fuselage rather than wet wings in conventional aircraft. This leads to a longer, wider fuselage; adding more skin friction drag and wave drag due to the extra wetted area; extra tank weight; and weight and balance variations during flight.

Gaseous hydrogen may be used for short-haul aircraft. Liquid hydrogen might be needed for long-haul aircraft.

Hydrogen's high specific energy means it would need less fuel weight for the same range, ignoring the repercussion of added volume and tank weight. As airliners have a fuel fraction of the Maximum Takeoff Weight MTOW between 26% for medium-haul to 45% for long-haul, maximum fuel weight could be reduced to % to % of the MTOW, but this would be the case only for the unusual maximum fuel case of the payload-range tradeoff.

The efficiency of a hydrogen-fueled aircraft is a trade-off of the larger wetted area, lower fuel weight and added tank weight, varying with the aircraft size. Hydrogen is better suited for short range airliners, while longer ranges may need new aircraft designs such as blended wing body.

Liquid hydrogen is one of the best coolants used in engineering, and precooled jet engines have been proposed to use this property for cooling the intake air of hypersonic aircraft, or even for cooling the aircraft's skin itself, particularly for scramjet-powered aircraft.

Emissions and environmental impact 

However, hydrogen combustion produces up to 90% less nitrogen oxides than kerosene fuel, and it eliminates the formation of particulate matter.

If hydrogen is available in quantity from low-carbon power such as wind or nuclear, its use in aircraft will produce fewer greenhouse gases than current aircraft: water vapor and a small amount of nitrogen oxide. Currently very little hydrogen is produced using low-carbon energy sources.

A 2020 study by the EU Clean Sky 2 and Fuel Cells and Hydrogen 2 Joint Undertakings found that hydrogen could power aircraft by 2035 for short-range aircraft. A short-range aircraft (< ) with hybrid Fuel cell/Turbines could reduce climate impact by 70–80% for a 20–30% additional cost, a medium-range airliner with H2 turbines could have a 50–60% reduced climate impact for a 30–40% overcost, and a long-range aircraft (> ) also with H2 turbines could reduce climate impact by 40–50% for a 40–50% additional cost. Research and development would be required, in aircraft technology and into hydrogen infrastructure, regulations and certification standards.

History

Demonstrations 

In February 1957, a Martin B-57B of the NACA flew on hydrogen for 20 min for one of its two Wright J65 engines rather than jet fuel. On 15 April 1988, the Tu-155 first flew as the first hydrogen-powered experimental aircraft, an adapted Tu-154 airliner.

Boeing converted a two-seat Diamond DA20 to run on a fuel cell designed and built by Intelligent Energy. It first flew on April 3, 2008. The Antares DLR-H2 is a hydrogen-powered aeroplane from Lange Aviation and the German aerospace center. In July 2010, Boeing unveiled its hydrogen powered Phantom Eye UAV, that uses two converted Ford Motor Company piston engines.

In 2010, the Rapid 200FC concluded six flight tests fueled by gaseous hydrogen.
The aircraft and the electric and energy system was developed within the European Union's  project coordinated by the Politecnico di Torino.
Hydrogen gas is stored at 350 bar, feeding a  fuel cell powering a  electric motor along a  lithium polymer battery pack.

On January 11, 2011, an AeroVironment Global Observer unmanned aircraft completed its first flight powered by a hydrogen-fueled propulsion system.

Developed by Germany's DLR Institute of Engineering Thermodynamics, the DLR HY4 four-seater was powered by a hydrogen fuel cell, its first flight took place on September 29, 2016. It has the possibility to store  of hydrogen, 4x11 kW fuel cells and 2x10 kWh batteries.

On 19 January 2023, ZeroAvia flew its Dornier 228 testbed with one turboprop replaced by a prototype hydrogen-electric powertrain in the cabin, consisting of two fuel cells and a lithium-ion battery for peak power.

On 2 March 2023, Universal Hydrogen flew a Dash 8 40-passenger testbed with one engine powered by their hydrogen-electric powertrain. The company has received an order from Connect Airways to convert 75 ATR 72-600 with their hydrogen powertrains.

Aircraft projects 

In 1975, Lockheed prepared a study of liquid hydrogen fueled subsonic transport aircraft for NASA Langley, exploring airliners carrying 130 passengers over 2,780 km (1500 nmi); 200 passengers over 5,560 km (3,000 nmi); and 400 passengers over 9,265 km (5,000 nmi).

Between April 2000 and May 2002, the European Commission funded half of the Airbus-led Cryoplane Study, assessing the configurations, systems, engines, infrastructure, safety, environmental compatibility and transition scenarios.

In September 2020, Airbus presented three ZEROe hydrogen-fuelled concepts aiming for commercial service by 2035: a 100-passenger turboprop, a 200-passenger turbofan, and a futuristic design based around a blended wing body. 
The aircraft are powered by gas turbines rather than fuel cells.

ATI is supported by Airbus, Rolls-Royce, GKN, Spirit, General Electric, Reaction Engines, Easyjet, NATS, Belcan, Eaton, Mott MacDonald and the MTC.

In August 2021 the UK Government claimed it was the first to have a Hydrogen Strategy. This report included a suggested strategy for hydrogen powered aircraft along with other transport modes.

In March 2022, FlyZero detailed its three concept aircraft:
 its FZN-1E narrowbody has rear-mounted hydrogen-burning turbofans, a T-tail and nose-mounted canards, a  longer fuselage than the Airbus A320neo becoming up to  wider at the rear to accommodate two cryogenic fuel tanks, and a larger wingspan requiring folding wing-tips for a  range with a  cruise;

Propulsion projects 

In March 2021, Cranfield Aerospace Solutions announced the Project Fresson switched from batteries to hydrogen for the nine-passenger Britten-Norman Islander retrofit for a September 2022 demonstration. Project Fresson is supported by the Aerospace Technology Institute in partnership with the UK Department for Business, Energy & Industrial Strategy and Innovate UK.

Pratt & Whitney wants to associate its geared turbofan architecture with its Hydrogen Steam Injected, Inter‐Cooled Turbine Engine (HySIITE) project, to avoid carbon dioxide emissions, reduce NOx emissions by 80%, and reduce fuel consumption by 35% compared with the current jet-fuel PW1100G, for a service entry by 2035 with a compatible airframe.
On 21 February 2022, the US Department of Energy through the OPEN21 scheme run by its Advanced Research Projects Agency-Energy (ARPA-E) awarded P&W $3.8 million for a two-year early stage research initiative, to develop the combustor and the heat exchanger used to recover water vapour in the exhaust stream, injected into the combustor to increase its power, and into the compressor as an intercooler, and into the turbine as a coolant.

In February 2022, Airbus announced a demonstration of a liquid hydrogen-fueled turbofan, with CFM International modifying the combustor, fuel system and control system of a GE Passport, mounted on a fuselage pylon on an A380 prototype, for a first flight expected within five years.

Proposed aircraft and prototypes

Historical
Lockheed CL-400 Suntan, 1950's concept, dropped for the SR-71
National Aerospace Plane, 1986–1993 concept with a scramjet, cancelled during development
Tupolev Tu-155, 1988 modified Tupolev Tu-154 testbed, flew over 100 flights
AeroVironment Global Observer, 2010-2011 fuel-cell powered drone demonstrator, performed 9 flights before crashing
Boeing Phantom Eye, 2012-2016 piston engine powered drone demonstrator, flew 9 times with flights lasting up to 9 hours

Projects
AeroDelft, a student team creating a gaseous and liquid hydrogen fuelled drone and Sling 4
Airbus ZEROe, presented in late 2020, it aims to create four concept aircraft and launch the first commercial zero-emission aircraft, entering service by 2035
DLR Smartfish, two seat experimental lifting body; based on the previous Hyfish model
Project Fresson, a Britten-Norman Islander retrofit
Reaction Engines Skylon, orbital hydrogen fuelled spaceplane
Reaction Engines A2, antipodal hypersonic jet airliner
ZeroAvia HyFlyer (fuel-cell powered Piper PA-46 demonstrator)

See also
Electric aircraft
Emerging aviation fuels

References

External links
 
 
 
 

 
Aircraft configurations
Aviation and the environment